is a passenger railway station  located in the city of Odawara, Kanagawa Prefecture, Japan, operated by the Odakyu Electric Railway.

Lines
Kayama Station is served by the Odakyu Odawara Line, and is located 76.2 kilometers from the line’s terminus at Shinjuku Station.

Station layout
The station consists of two opposed side platforms with two tracks, connected to the station building by a footbridge.

Platforms

History
Kayama Station was opened on 1 April 1927 on the Odakyu Odawara Line of the Odakyu Electric Railway with direct express service only to Shinjuku. The station became a stop on regularly scheduled normal services only from June 1945. Limited express services were resumed from 1946, and commuter express services from 1960-1964.

Station numbering was introduced in January 2014 with Kayama being assigned station number OH43.

Passenger statistics
In fiscal 2019, the station was used by an average of 8,589 passengers daily.

The passenger figures for previous years are as shown below.

Surrounding area
Sakawa River
Ninomiya Sontoku Memorial Museum
 Johoku Technical High School
 Sakurai Elementary School
 Johoku Junior High School

See also
List of railway stations in Japan

References

External links

Odakyu Railway home page 

Railway stations in Kanagawa Prefecture
Railway stations in Japan opened in 1927
Odakyu Odawara Line
Railway stations in Odawara